Rhiannon Elizabeth King (née Jones) (b 1972) is a British Anglican priest. Since 2019, she has served as Archdeacon of Ipswich in the Diocese of St Edmundsbury and Ipswich, and as the Director of Inspiring Ipswich—a church-planting project aiming to develop 25 new worshipping communities in Ipswich Deanery.

King was educated at Exeter University, Brunel University and Anglia Ruskin University. She was ordained in the Church of England as a deacon in 2000 and as a priest in 2001. She served her title at Huntingdon between 2000 and 2004. She was the incumbent at Great Wilbraham from 2004 to 2010. She then held administrative roles in the Diocese of Birmingham before being appointed archdeacon.

References

1972 births
Living people
21st-century English Anglican priests
Alumni of the University of Exeter
Alumni of Anglia Ruskin University
Alumni of Brunel University London
Archdeacons of Ipswich
Women Anglican clergy